Sherko Haji-Rasouli (born September 1, 1980) is a former Iranian professional football player. But now a Canadian football player. He played for the Montreal Alouettes and BC Lions of the Canadian Football League.

College career 
Haji-Rasouli played collegiately at the University of Miami in the U.S. state of Florida. While playing for the Hurricanes, Haji-Rasouli was twice selected to the All-Big East team.

Professional career 
Haji-Rasouli was drafted by the Montreal Alouettes in the 2002 CFL Draft (2nd round, 12th overall). In 2003, he suffered a season-ending injury, limiting him to just one game.

In 2004, Haji-Rasouli played all 18 games in his final season in Montreal.

Haji-Rasouli was signed by the Lions as a free agent prior to the 2005 season. In 2005, Haji-Rasouli played 16 games primarily as the Lions' first backup offensive lineman though he later moved into the starting lineup (starting 5 games) after an injury to Jamal Powell. Haji-Rasouli caught 1 pass for 3 yards in an August 19, 2005 game against the Hamilton Tiger-Cats.

In 2006, Haji-Rasouli played most of the season as a backup but received some starts when Kelly Bates was injured.

On January 31, 2011, Haji-Rasouli was released by the Lions.

References

1980 births
Living people
BC Lions players
Canadian football offensive linemen
Sportspeople of Iranian descent
Iranian expatriate sportspeople in the United States
Miami Hurricanes football players
Montreal Alouettes players
People from Shiraz
Iranian emigrants to Canada
Iranian players of Canadian football
Iranian players of American football
Sportspeople from Fars province